Lance Robson (27 December 1939 – 30 November 1987)  was an English footballer who played as a centre forward, making over 200 appearances in the Football League.

Career
Born in Newcastle upon Tyne, Robson turned professional with hometown team Newcastle United in 1958, but left in 1960 without making the first team. Robson later played for Darlington, Scarborough, Stockton and Hartlepool United, before retiring in 1970.

Personal life
Robson was married to Barbara and had five children. He died in 1987, aged only 47.

During his footballing career, Robson was well known as the football-playing dentist. He operated a dental practice in Darlington, and following his death this dental practice continues, being run by one of his sons (also called Lance).

References

1939 births
1987 deaths
English footballers
Newcastle United F.C. players
Darlington F.C. players
Scarborough F.C. players
Stockton F.C. players
Hartlepool United F.C. players
English Football League players
Association football forwards